Sainte-Agathe-des-Monts is a town in the province of Quebec, Canada, in the regional county municipality of Les Laurentides in the administrative region of Laurentides, also known as the "Laurentians" or the Laurentian Mountains (in English).

The town has been twinned with Lagny-sur-Marne, France since 1969 and Saranac Lake, New York since 2002.

History

Settlement
In 1849, the first families arrived on the northern fringe of the area, a settlement established by Augustin-Norbert Morin.

Beginning in 1850, a rapid colonization of the region began. The arriving families were primarily of French Catholic background. The village is centred on a Catholic church built in 1904. In 1865, the land on which the church stands was donated to the parish by Dr. Luc-Eusèbe Larocque, brother of the Monsignor. Dr. Larocque had amassed a fortune in the California Gold Rush and had decided to live the life of a seigneur. He bought several farms around Lac à la Truite (Trout Lake) and area but was too kind-hearted to ask for the rents. There is also a smaller Anglican church, "Holy Trinity Anglican Parish", in the town. In 1926 the Lord Bishop of the Anglican Church of Montreal presided over the dedication of the current building. The English Protestant community grew from the time the train first arrived in 1892.

Development
With the completion of a railway to Sainte-Agathe-des-Monts in 1892, the town experienced a rapid increase in population. Between 1892 and 1911, a number of spas and hospitals were established. In 1899, a tuberculosis hospital was founded by Dr. Arthur Richer. Elizabeth Wand, a nurse from New York City established a spa, which still operates as Auberge Tour du Lac. It was believed at the time that fresh mountain air could help cure tuberculosis and other pulmonary diseases. By 1910, many wealthy families from Montreal and northern United States had built residences along the shoreline of Lac des Sables. Octavien Rolland, third son of J.B. Rolland, founder of Rolland Paper was among the first to arrive. Between 1892 and 1910, the assessed value of the buildings in Sainte-Agathe-des-Monts had increased 20 times. From the 1950s to the 1980s, the town was a popular tourist centre with large resort hotels and many shops and restaurants.

Recent times

In the 1980s, Sainte-Agathe-des-Monts grew as a four-season tourist destination with a broad range of activities for cottagers and residents alike. As a growing service-centre for the surrounding region, its economic base became more diverse with a strong foundation of tourism activities that included, in the summer, horse-back riding, boating, fishing, and lakeside recreation, as well as the winter activities of cross-country skiing, dog-sled racing, skating, and ice hockey. While the train is no longer in service, there is an extensive bike path that has replaced it called "Le Petit Train Du Nord". It directly connects to other paths that extend as far as Montreal.

Today, the town is characterized by its history and tradition of B&Bs, inns, hotels, and spas. As a growing municipality, it has a developing service area that includes a new Walmart, Super 8, and Jean Coutu (among others) strategically placed on the edge of the town so as to not affect its village atmosphere.

On February 27, 2002, Sainte-Agathe-Nord and Ivry-sur-le-Lac merged with Sainte-Agathe-des-Monts to form an expanded city; however Ivry-sur-le-Lac later demerged in 2006.

English community
Next to Mont Tremblant, Sainte-Agathe-des-Monts has the largest population of English-speaking summer cottage residents in the Laurentians (with a smaller but still sizable winter cottage population as well, particularly on the weekends). Generations of English-speaking cottagers from Montreal, Ontario, New York and New Jersey vacation amidst the lakes and mountains surrounding the town.

Demographics 

Population trend:
 Population in 2011: 10115 (2006 to 2011 population change: 4.5%)
 Population in 2006: 9679
 Population in 2001:
 Sainte-Agathe-des-Monts: 7121
 Sainte-Agathe-Nord: 1566
The total figure is 8687.  However, a later revised total figure was 8964.
 Population in 1996:
 Sainte-Agathe-des-Monts: 5669
 Sainte-Agathe-Nord: 1454
 Sainte-Agathe-Sud: 2209
 Population in 1991:
 Sainte-Agathe-des-Monts: 5452
 Sainte-Agathe-Nord: 1221
 Sainte-Agathe-Sud: 1918

Mother tongue (permanent residents, excluding seasonal cottagers):
 French as first language: 91.3%
 English as first language: 4.8%
 Other as first language: 0.9%

Environment
The town is underlain by anorthosite bedrock which is covered by stony sandy loam soil with classic podzol profile development.

Education
Commission scolaire des Laurentides is headquartered in this town.
 Francophone primary schools: Notre-Dame-de-la-Sagesse, Fleur-des-Neiges, Lionel-Groulx, Monseigneur-Bazinet
 Secondary school: École polyvalente des Monts

The Sir Wilfrid Laurier School Board operates Sainte Agathe Academy, a primary and secondary Anglophone school, in the community.

Notable people

Jean-Jacques Bertrand (1916–1973), former Quebec premier, was a native of Sainte-Agathe-des-Monts.
Jonathan Drouin, NHL player for the Montreal Canadiens, was born in Sainte-Agathe-des-Monts.
Pierre-Luc Dubois, NHL player for the Winnipeg Jets, was born in Sainte-Agathe-des-Monts.
Mikaël Kingsbury, Olympic gold medal freestyle skier
Gaston Miron, poet, was born and raised in Sainte-Agathe-des-Monts
Mordecai Richler, author, set his novel, The Apprenticeship of Duddy Kravitz, in Sainte-Agathe-des-Monts.
 Ronnie Stern (born 1967), ice hockey player
 Youri Chassin, MNA for Saint-Jerome since 2018.

Notable organizations
The Commission Scolaire des Laurentides school board is headquartered in the town.
The Centre Hospitalier Laurentien is the local hospital.

References

External links

 Official site 
 Sainte-Agathe-des-Monts commercial website
 History of Sainte-Agathe-des-Monts region
 History of Sainte-Agathe-des-Monts town
 French Wikipedia page
 BFI entry about 'Snow Fiesta', an NFB film of the 1950 games.

 
Cities and towns in Quebec
Designated places in Quebec